Cape Bojeador is the northwestern tip of the island of Luzon in the Philippines. The cape is best known for its Spanish lighthouse, the most visited lighthouse in the country and a favorite shooting venue for local movies and television series.

Geography
Cape Bojeador is the first land sighted by vessels approaching Luzon from the northern ports of China and East Asia. It is located in the southern end of Nagabungan Cove in a small village called Paayas in Burgos municipality. The cape reaches a height of  near the lighthouse, sloping down to   near the shore and rising southeastward to a mountain ridge. It is composed of greywackes and volcanic rocks dated as Middle Miocene.

The cape is devoid of trees due to constant strong winds. It is surrounded by rocky cliffs and a reef of breakers projecting from it.

References

Landforms of Ilocos Norte
Bojeador